Basti Islamabad is the town of Mankera Tehsil, of Bhakkar District, in the Punjab province of Pakistan. It is situated about 290 kilometres west of the city of Lahore.

Bhakkar is located in the west of Punjab on the border of Khyber-Pakhtunkhwa. The Indus River flows on the Western side of the District and the Jehlum and Chenab rivers both flow on the eastern side; these rivers sometimes cause havoc during monsoon season. One-third of the land is sandy of which small portion is irrigated by Thal canal. The rest of the sandy land is cultivated and is entirely dependent upon rains. People mostly depend on agriculture which is highly dependent on rain falls. As such people experience poverty. Education and health facilities are not adequately available.

History

Basti Islamabad was named and founded by Maulana Muhammad Abdurehman in 1961. There is evidence that suggests that a state by this name existed during Alexander's invasion of the sub-continent. The Arabs however called it Manker Kot, and during Muhammad bin Qasim's rule in greater Sindh, the conquest of Mankera by one of his generals, Abul Asswad bin Zahar, is recorded. The first Muslim governor of Mankera was Ahmed bin Khuzema, who died in Mankera and is buried in Mankera fort.

Following the downfall of Arab rule in Sindh, the Hindu king of Kanauj took possession of Mankera followed by the Mekan. The Abdali kings annexed Mankera and the adjoining areas and the Baloch gave way to Saddo Zai Pathans. The Pathan rule of the state ended with the famous siege of Mankera by Ranjit Singh which resulted in the forfeiture of Nawab Surbuland's claim to Mankera and his retreat to Dera Ismail Khan.

Mankera fort, the principal feature of the town, lies half a kilometre to the left of the Bhakkar highway. The fort was constructed in two phases. The initial construction of the brick fort was carried out during the time of the Baloch rule, and further fortification in the form of a thick mud wall was undertaken during the Pathan rule. Today the fort and its fortification is mostly in ruins. The major part of the mud wall still exists, however decay and neglect is abundantly clear. The main fort is mostly in ruins except for a well, a tomb, and a few signs of masonry. The outer walls of the citadel are intact. During the dying days of the Mughal empire, Mankera's Saddo Zai rulers with the help of their Abdali benefactors emerged as a force to reckon with in this area. Mankera was the seat of their dominions. Nowadays the Tomb of Mankera is not in good condition and is broken at all the places and the walls.

The Sikh occupation of Mankera is evident. Next to the Jamia Masjid of Mankera are the ruins of a temple built during the Sikh rule, and even the tomb of Nawab Surbuland Khan, just outside the main citadel has a Hindu aura about its construction.

The Sikh annexation of this area began in 1821, and was completed with the fall of Mankera in the autumn of that year. Ranjit Singh personally led the troops that besieged Mankera. The siege lasted for 22 days and at a great cost to the invaders. Mankera, fortified by the brick wall, had a distinct advantage of its position being in the middle of a desert. The besieging army had not only to deal with the musketry of the Mankera troops but had to find out ways to deal with the difficulties of the terrain. Water had to be carried for the troops from considerable distances. Ranjit Singh ordered his army to dig several wells. Twelve such wells were dug.

The siege dragged on for 22 days during which time the Nawab held his own; however the desertions of his sardars and the demolition of one of the minarets of Jamia Masjid—taken as a bad omen—forced the Nawab to surrender the fort to the Sikhs. The iron ball shot from the big guns, including the Zam Zama employed by Ranjit Singh during the Mankera expedition, is still preserved in the mosque's compound. Following the surrender, the Muslim population of Mankera was expelled and replaced by Sikhs and Hindus, and the area was put under the direct control of the Lahore empire. The Sikh rule of Mankera ended in 1847 and for the next 140 years Mankera existed as a non-entity.

Mankera's other claim to fame is the incident, which took place in 1794 when Prince Hummayun Shah, son of Taimur Shah, the Abdali King and a claimant to the throne of Kabul, made a vain attempt to overthrow his brother, Zaman Shah. His brother comprehensively defeated him and Hummayun fled to Thal Sagar. The Saddo Zai Nawab of Mankera, Nawab Mohammad Khan, apprehended him at Leaih. Hummayun's son was killed in the scuffle that followed his arrest, and at the behest of Zaman Shah, Nawab had Hummayun's eyes put out. Hummayun spent the rest of his life imprisoned in Mankera fort. A tomb in the middle of the fort is believed to be that of Prince Hummayun, and is considered a minor saint by the locals. On the other hand, the Nawab received the title of Surbuland Khan and the territory of Dera Ismail Khan from the King. It was the same Surbuland Khan who had to surrender to Ranjit Singh some 27 years later, and retreat to Dera Ismail Khan.

Basti Islamabad today 

Basti Islamabad's main bazaar (market) has neat rows of shops on either side. The town has two government schools − one elementary (upgraded to high by 2017) school and one primary school for girls. The famous Bablian-wala masjid is mostly intact, but disrepair and neglect is evident. The streets are paved and wide. 

Basti Islamabad's Indo-Islamic Culture is known as The colorful culture.
Mankera is the second biggest tehsil after sher garh. The major source of income of Basti Islamabad's people is chickpeas (chana).

Transport 
The nearest airport to Basti Islamabad is Dera Ismail Khan – travellers used to be able to catch a flight either Islamabad or Peshawar to this city and then onto Basti Islamabad. However this airport is now out of use – the only way to get there is by bus. The bus takes 6 hours from Peshawar to reach Dera Ismail Khan and 7 hours from Islamabad and 6 hours from lahore. From Dera Ismail Khan it takes three hours to reach Basti Islamabad and from Bhakkar it takes a drive of 50 minutes.

The direct Bus service is also available from Lahore. Basti Islamabad is 310 km away from Lahore and it is located on main Lahore-Dera Ismail Khan road.

One can get to Basti Islamabad through a fast APV car service from Sidhu Adda, but APV car service is from Lahore to Jhang. From Jhang city, there is an AC and Non-AC bus/van service for Bhakkar and Dera Ismail Khan. Basti Islamabad is 9km apart from Haiderabad Thall which occurs on Jhang Bhakkar road, this is the same road which is from Islamabad to Karachi through Saraye Muhajir - to- Chakwal, Mianwali, Muzzafar Garh, Multan, BahawalPur, Rahim Yar Khan and Hyderabad.

Main Town Basti Islamabad
Basti Islamabad
Bablian Wala
Shikar Pur
Chah Kamal Wala
Godhay Wala
Sidhu Adda
Chor Wala 
Moolay Wala
Chonki Wala
Shah Syed Ali

References

External links
 Basti Islamabad on BigBlueBall
 Wasib | Ancient Riasat Mankera 

Populated places in Bhakkar District